Abdel-Karim Deghmi (born 20th century) is a Jordanian politician who has been Speaker of the House of Representatives since 15 November 2021. He attended Expo 2020 in 2020.

See also 
List of current presidents of legislatures

References 

Living people

20th-century births

Year of birth missing (living people)
Speakers of the House of Representatives (Jordan)

21st-century Jordanian politicians